Notholimnophila is a genus of crane fly in the family Limoniidae.

Distribution
New Zealand.

Species
N. exclusa (Alexander, 1922)

References

Limoniidae
Diptera of Australasia